Zhang Dake was a Chinese diplomat. He was Ambassador of the People's Republic of China to Czechoslovakia (1985–1988), East Germany (1988–1990) and Yugoslavia (1991–1993).

References

Ambassadors of China to the Czech Republic
Ambassadors of China to East Germany
Ambassadors of China to Yugoslavia
Living people
Date of birth missing (living people)
Year of birth missing (living people)